Fernando Miguel Kaufmann (born 2 February 1985) is a Brazilian footballer who plays as a goalkeeper for Fortaleza.

Club career

Early career
Born in Venâncio Aires, Fernando Miguel started his senior professional career in 2005 with Grêmio. In the following years, he represented Brasil-RS, Porto Alegre, Novo Hamburgo, Arapongas, Londrina, Esportivo.

Juventude
On 4 April 2012, Fernando Miguel joined Juventude from Lajeadense. Among the matches he played for the club, it included his appearance in a 1–1 draw against Grêmio in the semi-final of Campeonato Gaúcho which was won by Juventude via the penalty shoot-out.

Vitória
On 25 September 2013, Fernando Miguel joined Série A (top tier) club Vitória. He signed permanently with the club in April 2014. In September 2017, he was diagonised with acute plantar fasciitis and was ruled out of play for a league match against Atlético-MG.

Honours
Fortaleza
Copa do Nordeste: 2022
Campeonato Cearense: 2022

References

External links

1985 births
Living people
Sportspeople from Rio Grande do Sul
Brazilian footballers
Association football goalkeepers
Campeonato Brasileiro Série A players
Campeonato Brasileiro Série B players
Grêmio Foot-Ball Porto Alegrense players
Grêmio Esportivo Brasil players
Esporte Clube Novo Hamburgo players
Porto Alegre Futebol Clube players
Londrina Esporte Clube players
Clube Esportivo Bento Gonçalves players
Esporte Clube Juventude players
Esporte Clube Vitória players
CR Vasco da Gama players
Atlético Clube Goianiense players
Fortaleza Esporte Clube players